Gordon Lake is a lake in Alberta, Canada.

Gordon Lake has the name of William Gordon, a local postal employee.

See also
List of lakes of Alberta

References

Lakes of Alberta